The National League (previously known as the National Women's League) is the top-level women's football league in New Zealand. Unlike its male counterpart, the New Zealand National League, previously the teams were run by the regional federations rather than as collaborative entities between local clubs. This has changed for the 2021 season as New Zealand Football look to move it to club based football. The current season will see four teams qualify from the Northern League to join federation teams from Central Football, Capital Football, Canterbury United Pride and Southern United.

History

The league was founded in 2002 and ran until the end of the 2007, after which the league went on hiatus. The league was resumed in 2009 with five federations participating, as well as the national women's under-19 team development squad. The league currently contains seven teams, one run by each federation.

The league was run as a pure round-robin league format in 2002 and 2003. From 2004 to 2007 there were play-offs, with the second- and third-placed teams after the round-robin competing in a one legged semi-final at the second-placed team's home ground. The winner of that and the first-place team then played the Grand Final to decide the champion.

From 2009 to 2012, the league was split into two divisions, a Northern and a Southern Conference, each of four teams that play each other twice. After the season there are semi-finals, with the winner of each conference playing the runners-up of the other. The winners of those play the Grand Final. In 2013 the league reverted to the system used from 2004 to 2008.

From 2010, the league has run in the summer (previous seasons were held over winter). From 2010 to 2014, the league became age-restricted as a national women's youth league, with players of under-20 age only participating. The restrictions were removed in 2015, and since then the league has run as an unrestricted full women's league. 

NZ Football looked to move the National Women's League to club-based competition like the Men's competition by 2020. It also hoped to expand the number of games each federation plays in 2018 to a two-round system where each team plays home and away once against every other team in the competition.

It was decided to do the move to a club-based league slowly to bring the quality of women's football up first. So from 2021 season, four teams will qualify from the Northern League and will join federation teams from Central Football, Capital Football, Canterbury United Pride and Southern United.

Participants

Current
 4 teams from the Northern Regional League
 Auckland United
 Eastern Suburbs
 Northern Rovers
 Western Springs
 Central Football (as "Central Soccer" until 2007) (2002–2007, 2010–
 Capital Football (as "Capital Soccer" until 2006) (2002–
 Canterbury United Pride (as "Mainland Soccer" (2002–2005), "Mainland Pride" (2006–2007, 2010–), and "Mainland Football" (2009)) (2002–
 Southern United (as "Soccersouth" until 2007) (2002–

Former
 Auckland Under-20 Development (2010–2011)
 Auckland Football (2002–2020)
 New Zealand Football Development (2005–2006, 2009, 2014–2016)
This comprised the national under-19 team (2005), national under-18 team (2006, 2014–2016), and national under-17 team (2009). Although New Zealand Development competed from 2005, they were ineligible to take part in the semifinals and final until the 2009 season.
 Northern Lights (as "North Harbour" until 2007 and then Northern Football until 2010) (2002–2007, 2010–2020)
Northern Region Development (2011–2013)
 WaiBOP United (2002–2020)
 Young Ferns (2013–2014)

List of champions
The list of champions:

*Home team for final

See also
New Zealand Football Championship

References

External links
Official website

  
New Zealand
Association football leagues in New Zealand
Summer association football leagues
Women's association football in New Zealand
association football
Professional sports leagues in New Zealand